The following lists events that happened during 1919 in Afghanistan.

Incumbents
 Monarch – Habibullah Khan (until February 20), Nasrullah Khan (February 21-February 28), Amanullah Khan (starting February 28)

February 20, 1919
The amir Habibullah Khan, who has always been a loyal friend to Britain, is murdered whilst camping in the Laghman Valley. Thereupon ensues a competition for the throne. At Jalalabad a proclamation is issued that Nasrullah Khan has assumed the throne, but in Kabul power is seized by Amanullah Khan, the third son of the late amir. Amanullah's mother was Habibullah's chief wife; but the late amirs eldest son is Inayatullah who appears to have supported the claims of Nasrullah. Amanullah soon shows, however, that he has control of the situation and the rival claimant withdraws. There is more than a suspicion that Nasrullah (a brother of the late sovereign) was not unduly disturbed at Habibullah's assassination. The new amir, Amanullah, begins his reign by announcing that he will punish those who are guilty of the assassination of his father, that he will institute reforms in the country, including the abolition of the virtual slavery, which exists in a disguised form, and that he will preserve the tradition of friendship with India. On April 13 a durbar is held at Kabul, at which the assassination of the late amir is investigated. A colonel is found guilty of committing the murder and executed, and the new amirs uncle, Nasrullah, is found guilty of complicity in the crime, and is sentenced to imprisonment for life.

Early May 1919
Amanullah launches what becomes known as the Third Anglo-Afghan War. A large Afghan army comes pouring across the Indian frontier and proceeds to pillage far and wide in the northwest provinces. Within a few days, and before the Afghans have suffered any serious defeats, the amir enters into tentative negotiations with the Indian government. The fighting continues, however, the British forces on the frontier being commanded by Gen. Sir Arthur Barrett. The aeroplanes attached to the Anglo-Indian forces bomb both Jalalabad and Kabul. After much procrastination a peace conference is opened at Rawalpindi on July 26, Sir Hamilton Grant representing the Indian government and Sardar Ali Ahmad Khan representing the amir. A preliminary peace (the Treaty of Rawalpindi) is signed on August 8. By the terms of the agreement the arrears of the late amirs subsidy are confiscated, and no subsidy is to be paid at present to the new amir. The Afghan privilege of importing arms and ammunition from India is also withdrawn. The frontier in the region of the Khyber is to be definitely demarcated by the Indian government, and the Afghans are to accept this demarcation. The Indian government expresses its willingness, however, to receive another Afghan mission six months later. Moreover, there is another item in the agreement which is subsequently made known and which evokes considerable criticism in England. In the past there was an agreement between Britain and Afghanistan that Afghanistan should have no relations with any foreign government except Britain. According to the new treaty this stipulation is withdrawn, the amirs government thus obtaining full liberty to enter into relations with any foreign government. It is regarded by many as a sinister comment on this agreement that during the year the amir sends a mission to Moscow.

April 13, 1919
Amir Amanullah Khan declared Afghanistan's independence from Britain.

 
Afghanistan, 1919 In
Afghanistan
Years of the 20th century in Afghanistan
1910s in Afghanistan